The "Marcia del Palio" (in English: "March of the Palio"), commonly also called Squilli la fe' (in English: "May the faith shrill"), is an ancient hymn that accompanies the historical costume parade called Corteo Storico that precedes the Palio of Siena.

Between one stop and another, in fact, while the representatives of the districts parade at the reel of the "Diana's pattern"; the musicians of the Palazzo Pubblico play the march of the Palio while the trumpets of the Municipality play the blasts of the party on the silver clarions.

History 
The March of the Palio was composed by Pietro Formichi in 1880 for the municipal band of the city of Siena, which he then conducted jointly with the annexed music school. From a musical point of view it is a 2/4 composition for fanfare, or for band formations with exclusively brass instruments, originally created without a sung accompaniment. The lyrics, written by the poet Idilio dell'Era and modified by Bruno Ancilli, were added later.<ref>{{Cite web|last=alt="">|first=

The march was performed for the first time during the historical parade of 2 July 1885 and is still played today in Piazza del Campo and in the city streets, during the passage of the procession from the Prefecture to the Casato street, from the fanfare of the Palazzo Pubblico, which parades at the beginning of the Corteo Storico, behind the Macemen and the standard bearer of the Sienese gonfalon, and is made up of 12 drummers, 18 trumpets and 30 musicians with various brass instruments.

The blasts of the palace trumpets for the Carroccio, on the other hand, date back to 1904 and are the work of Salvatore Giaretta.

Over the years the March of the Palio has reached such a level of appreciation by the Sienese citizens that it has now become an anthem of the city, usually sung even outside the Palio of Siena, on the occasion of sports competitions of local football and basket teams, together with the Canto della Verbena.

Lyrics 
The verses of the March of the Palio written by Idilio dell'Era and revised by Bruno Ancilli.

See also 

 Republic of Siena
 Ports of the Republic of Siena
 Palio di Siena
 Coinage of the Republic of Siena

References

Bibliography 

 Virgilio Grassi, Le Contrade di Siena e le loro feste - Il Palio attuale, Siena, Edizioni Periccioli, 1972.
 Sergio Profeti, Il segreto della mossa, Siena, Edizioni Sunto, 1985.
 William Heywood, Nostra donna d'agosto e il Palio di Siena, Siena, Protagon Editori Toscani, 1993, ISBN 978-88-8024-002-0.

Siena
Culture of Tuscany
Italian traditions